Muhammad Ali and Jimmy Ellis fought each other in a boxing match at the Astrodome in Houston on July 26, 1971. Ali won the bout through a technical knockout when the referee stopped the fight in the twelfth round. This was Ali's first boxing match after Fight of the Century, and had originally been scheduled as a bout between Wilt Chamberlain, who had challenged him, then trained for the bout with Cus D'Amato, but later withdrew from the fight.

References

Ellis
1971 in boxing
July 1971 sports events in the United States
Boxing in Houston
1971 in sports in Texas